Patricia Sarena Caretto (born January 4, 1951), also known by her married name Patricia  Brown, is an American former competition swimmer and former world record-holder in two distance freestyle events.  Caretto competed at the 1968 Summer Olympics in Mexico City as a 17-year-old, and placed fifth in the final of the women's 800-meter freestyle. She retired after the Olympics competition. She is a former world record holder in the women's 800-meter and 1,500-meter freestyle, having set world records in those events on eight occasions.

Post-Olympic retirement
Caretto married her Cal State Long Beach classmate in 1971. She taught physical education to students with motor-skill or learning disabilities in Garden Grove Unified School District in California.

Caretto was inducted into the International Swimming Hall of Fame as an "Honor Swimmer" in 1987.

See also
 List of members of the International Swimming Hall of Fame
 World record progression 800 metres freestyle
 World record progression 1500 metres freestyle

References

External links
 Patty Caretto (USA) – Honor Swimmer profile at International Swimming Hall of Fame 

1951 births
Living people
American female freestyle swimmers
World record setters in swimming
Olympic swimmers of the United States
Swimmers from Los Angeles
Swimmers at the 1968 Summer Olympics
21st-century American women